Naagini 2 ( Female serpent 2) is a 2020 Indian Kannada-language television series produced for Zee Kannada. It premiered on February 17, 2020, and is digitally available on ZEE5.

The series is a sequel to Naagini and loosely based on Phir Laut Aayi Naagin.

Plot 
The film begins as Shivani, a shape-shifting serpent, enters Earth to take revenge on the people who killed her husband, and to find Nagamani. She learns from Nagamatha that her husband Adishesha had been reborn on Earth, and will help to find Nagamani. Shivani finds out that Adishesha is between Trishool and Trivikram, who were in the same house where Trishool is the son of Nandisha (servant) and Trivikram is the son of Digvijay (Owner). Both of them were born at the same date and time, and Digvijay and his gang, including Nandisha, were the culprits who killed Adishesha and stole Nagamani.

Later Nandisha's mother Mahamaayi reveals that Trishool is actually Digvijay's son, and Trivikram is Nandisha's son. She exchanged the babies at birth because she wanted revenge on Digvijay, who stole Nagamani from Naagalok with the help of Tryambaka, before she could get her hands on Nagamani.

Trivikram and Trishool have the same snake mole. Trivikram is Adhisesha according to Shivani and Tryambaka. Trivikram remembers nothing about Adhisesha. Trishool and Trivikram fall in love with Shivani. Shivani recognizes the snake print in Trivikram and decides to marry him and rejects Trishool.  Digvijay and his family find out that Trishool is his real son. It is discovered that Trishool is Adhishesha. But Trishool has no memories or powers. Digvijay learns about Adishesha's reincarnation and is thinking to kill him with the help of his son, not knowing his son is actually Adhishesha.

Trivikram starts to hate Trishool as he thinks Trishool snatched his happiness because he is Digvijay's real son and Trivikram is the son of a driver. Trivikram also learns that Trishool is in love with Shivani. One night, he dreams of Trishool marrying Shivani and seeks help from his grandmother. Under her assistance seeks help from another shape shifting serpent mayangani who lives in Mayadweep away from Naaglok after she lost her love, to kill Trishool. Mayangani tries to kill Trishool, but her powers don't work on him. She understands that he is Adhishesha with whom she was in love years back, but he rejected her because he loved Shivani. Mayangani is happy as she learns about Adhishesha's rebirth and plans to pursue him and become the naagrani of Naaglok.  On the day of the Trivikram-Shivani marriage, Trishool forcefully marries her because Lord Shiva's power tells him that only he has the right to marry her as their love is for all births. Shivani, not knowing that Trishool is Adhishesha, starts to hate him as she thinks Trivikram is Adhishesha and he is the reason for her separation from Adishesha and Naaglok. Mayangani, along with Trivikram, make plans to separate Shivani and Trishool. Myangani's also calls Tryambaka to kill Shivani. Later Shivani kills Mayangani with the help of Thrikkala Muni and her own powers. Shivani uses her power and finds out that Adhisesha is none other than Trishool. Mayangani  curses Shivani that Adhisesha would never love her. As per the time runs, Shivani faces the Challenge to make Trishool understand her love for him. Mahamaye is born again to instruct Trivikram. Trivikram learns about Trishool and Shivani relationship. Trivikram decides to teach Sivani a lesson. Trishul learns that Trivikram is torturing her and the fight begins between Trishul and Trivikram where Trivikram pushes Trishul to Pathala Darbha. A man complains that he had seen Trivikram and Trishul fight. Digvijay questions Trivikram. Trivikram talks rudely to Digvijay and the  mole scares Digvijay and he learns that Trivikram was the person who had attacked him last time. Family members request Digvijay to take Trivikram back home. Later, Trivikram reveals Digvijay and his friends secret to Naandisha and his powers and how he obtained it.  Later Nandisha tells his mother that Trivikram has no legal right to have powers but Trishul has. He answers that Trishul is her original grandson not Trivikram. Trivikram learns that Trishul is Adishesha for whom Shivani came to Earth and Adishesha can be killed only with the nagamani. Trivikram finds that nagmani is in Digvijay's hand and asks Digvijay for it after which a fight takes place and the nagmani from Digvijay's hand falls into Pathala Darbha where Trishul is present. Dew to nagmani's power Trishul reaches Earth. Eventually Shivani is killed by Takshaka (Trayambaka's twin brother). Shailu, with the same figure of Shivaniö appears.

Cast

Main 
 Namratha Gowda as
 Naagini, a shape-shifting serpent/Adishesha's wife (main form); Queen Of Naagalok
 Shivani, Trishul's wife (human form); was Trivikram's love interest 
 Clone Shivani, an illusion created from Shivani's shadow by Bhairava Baba 
 Shailu, Shivani's look-alike artist 
 Goddess Parvathi, in the Story of  Shumbha Nishumbha told bye Digvijay's Mother/Grandmother of Trishul
 Ninaad Harithsa / Deepak Mahadev as
 Trishul Roy, Adishesha's reincarnated life; son of Digvijay and Damayanti. Adoptive son of Nandisha and Madhumathi. Reena's brother and Trivikram's adoptive brother. Shivani's husband. Mayangani's love interest. 
 Adishesha, King of Nagaloka; main form and previous incarnation of Trishul 
 Karthik Jayaram as Adishesha; king of Naaglok; husband of Naagini; Trishool's previous birth. 
 Deepika Das as Amrutha, a shape-shifting snake from Naagar, in a special appearance from the previous Naagini series

Recurring 
 Pranav Sridhar /Nagarajun Ballappa
 as  Trivikram; son of Nandisha and Madhumathi; adoptive son of Digvijay and Damayanthi; Trishool and Reena's adoptive brother; Shivani's ex-fiancé. 
 Aiswarya Shindogi as Mayangani, shape-shifting snake wants to marry Adhishesha and become the queen of Naagloka.
 Mohan Shankar as Digvijay. Trishool and Reena's father; Trivikram's adoptive father; he killed Adhishesha to acquire Naagmani.
 Muniraju as Nandisha; Trivikram's father; Trishool's adoptive father; Digvijay's driver and friend 
 Vijay (Mahadevi Serial Fame) 
 as Trayambaka, A Powerful Tantrik, The One Leads Digvijay gang to Acquire Nagamani 
 as Takshaka, A Powerful Tantrik and Brother of Trayambaka; Who Captures Shivani Soul and Burnt her Body with help of Bhupathi
 Rashmi as Neeli a shape-shifting serpent who came to earth to help Shivani 
 Ambarish Sarangi as Dhananjay, Digvijay's Brother and Disguised form of Digvijay
 Marina Tara as Nagamatha, Adhishesha's mother.
 Shwetha as Madhumati, Trivikram's mother; Trishool's adoptive mother.
 Laxman as Vishakantha; Digvijay's friend helped him kill Adhishesha and acquire Naagmani. 
 Jeevan Neenasam as Dandapani 
 Shashi as Samrat
 Prithvi Subbiah as Bhupathi 
 Prithviraj as Ajit, An Garuda from Garudaloka 
 Ananthavelu as Tavkal Rehman, Muslim Mowlvi
 Tejaswini Anandkumar/Megha SV
 as  Reena; Digvjay and Damayanti's daughter; Trishool's sister
 Surya Kiran as 
 Govinda, Trishool and Reena's uncle; Damayanti's brother 
 Bhairava  Baba, Digvijay's evil guru (Special Appearance from Previous Naagini Series)
 Prakash as Sambashiva. Digvijay's friend helped him kill Adhishesha and acquire Naagmani.
 Jennifer Antony /Rekha Sagar 
 as  Damayanti; Trishool and Reena's mother; Trivikram's adoptive mother; Digvijay's wife
 Pooja Durganna as Krishne, One of Sorcerer who Gives Dhananjay form to Digvijay 
 Deepika (Comedy Khiliadigalu) as Dodmalli 
 Riddhi Ashok as Chikmalli 
 Mahendra Prasad as Pakru 
 Hmt Vijay As Pashupathi, Owner of Drama Company 
 Rekha Das as Pashupathi's Wife and Makeup Artist of Drama Company 
 Puneeth Babu as Mahaguru of Nagaloka
 Praveen Atharva as Seshanaga
 Darshini Nagaraj  as Mohini
 Deepak Mahadev as Abhay,Investigation officer/Disguised form of Trishul 
 Shringeri Ramayya as Vasudeva Acharya 
 Vinaya Gowda as Nishumbha, Special Appearance 
 Cheluvaraj as Shumbha, Special Appearance 
 RK Chandan as lord Shiva
Jagadish Kumar as Aghoriq
Darshini gowda as Usha

Production 

Popular director and producer, Ramji, produces and directs this series. Trinity VFX creates the graphics.

Reception 
Naagini 2 delivered 11+ million impressions in the TRP charts within its first week of airing. It reached the top five position for most watched Kannada television program.

Dubbed Versions

References

External links 
 Naagini 2 at ZEE5

Kannada-language television shows
Television shows set in Karnataka
Indian television soap operas
Zee Kannada original programming